Rollen Franklin Hans, Jr. (born April 13, 1931) is a retired professional basketball shooting guard who played two season in the National Basketball Association (NBA) as a member of the Baltimore Bullets. He attended Long Island University.

External links
 

1931 births
Living people
Baltimore Bullets (1944–1954) players
Basketball players from Los Angeles
LIU Brooklyn Blackbirds men's basketball players
Shooting guards
Undrafted National Basketball Association players